Paul Griffin (August 6, 1937 – June 14, 2000) was an American pianist and session musician who recorded with hundreds of musicians from the 1950s to the 1990s.

Career
Born in Harlem, New York, he began as the touring pianist in the backing band for King Curtis and eventually worked with Bob Dylan, Steely Dan, Don McLean, the Isley Brothers, Van Morrison, the Shirelles, and Dionne Warwick. He may be best known for his colourful and distinctive playing on the Bob Dylan albums Highway 61 Revisited and Blonde on Blonde, and also on Steely Dan's Aja. He is extensively featured playing a virtuoso performance of gospel piano on Don McLean's single, "American Pie"  He is credited as co-author of the song "The Fez" on Steely Dan's The Royal Scam.

He was an arranger for The Warriors (1979) and Four Friends (1981) and performed in On Location: Robert Klein at Yale (1982) and on the soundtrack for Blue Sunshine (1976).

He died of a heart attack at his home in New York at the age of 62, suffering from complications of diabetes. He was awaiting a liver transplant at the time of his death.

Recordings

With Bob Dylan
 Bringing It All Back Home (Columbia Records, 1965)
 Highway 61 Revisited (Columbia Records, 1965)
 Blonde on Blonde (Columbia Records, 1966)
 Blood on the Tracks (Columbia Records, 1975)

With Dion DiMucci
 You're Not Alone (Warner Bros. Records, 1971)

With George Benson
 Goodies (Verve, 1968)

With Tom Rush
 Tom Rush (Columbia Records, 1970)

With Wilson Pickett
 In the Midnight Hour (Atlantic Records, 1965)
 It's Harder Now (Rounder Records, 1999)

With Michael Franks
 Tiger in the Rain (Warner Bros. Records, 1979)

With John Denver
 Rhymes & Reasons (RCA Records, 1969)
 Take Me to Tomorrow (RCA Records, 1970)
 Whose Garden Was This (RCA Records, 1970)
 Aerie (RCA Records, 1971)

With Peter, Paul and Mary
 Album 1700 (Warner Bros. Records, 1967)

With Al Kooper
 You Never Know Who Your Friends Are (Columbia Records, 1969)

With David Clayton-Thomas
 David Clayton-Thomas (Columbia Records, 1972)

With Gloria Loring
 ...And Now We Come to Distances (Evolution Records, 1970)
 Friends & Lovers (Atlantic Records, 1986)

With Melba Moore
 Peach Melba (Buddah Records, 1975)

With LaVern Baker
 See See Rider (Atlantic Records, 1963)

With Janis Siegel
 Experiment in White (Atlantic Records, 1982)

With Solomon Burke
 If You Need Me (Atlantic Records, 1963)
 King Solomon (Atlantic Records, 1968)
 I Wish I Knew (Atlantic Records, 1968)

With Jackie Lomax
 Home Is In My Head (Warner Bros. Records, 1971)

With Steely Dan
 The Royal Scam (ABC Records, 1976)
 Aja (ABC Records, 1977)

With Marlena Shaw
 Marlena (Blue Note Records, 1972)

With Roberta Flack and Donny Hathaway
 Roberta Flack Featuring Donny Hathaway (Atlantic Records, 1980)

With John Lennon and Yoko Ono
 Milk and Honey (Polydor Records, 1984)

With Don McLean
 American Pie (EMI, 1971)

With Carly Simon
 Carly Simon (Elektra Records, 1971)

With Roberta Flack
 Blue Lights in the Basement (Atlantic Records, 1977)
 I'm the One (Atlantic Records, 1982)

With Judy Collins
 Judith (Elektra Records, 1975)

With Cheryl Lynn
 In Love (Columbia Records, 1979)

With Gloria Gaynor
 Gloria Gaynor (Atlantic Records, 1982)

With Stephanie Mills
 Movin' in the Right Direction (ABC Records, 1974)

With Donald Fagen
 Kamakiriad (Reprise Records, 1993)

With Yoko Ono
 It's Alright (I See Rainbows) (Polygram Records, 1982)

With Van Morrison
 Blowin' Your Mind! (Bang Records, 1967)

With Paul Simon
 There Goes Rhymin' Simon (Columbia Records, 1973)
 Songs from The Capeman (Warner Bros. Records, 1997)

With Garland Jeffreys
 Garland Jeffreys (Atlantic Records, 1973)
 Guts for Love (Epic Records, 1982)
 Don't Call Me Buckwheat (BMG, 1991)

With Aretha Franklin
 Unforgettable: A Tribute to Dinah Washington (Columbia Records, 1964)
 La Diva (Arista Records, 1979)

With Bonnie Raitt
 Streetlights (Warner Bros. Records, 1974)

With Laura Nyro
 Eli and the Thirteenth Confession (Columbia Records, 1968)

With The Free Design
 Kites Are Fun (Project 3 Records, 1967)
 You Could Be Born Again (Project 3 Records, 1968)

References

External links

Paul Griffin obituary in The New York Times
Paul Griffin letter regarding his achievements

1937 births
2000 deaths
20th-century African-American musicians
20th-century American pianists
20th-century American male musicians
African-American pianists
American rock pianists
American male pianists
American organists
20th-century American keyboardists
American session musicians
People from Harlem